Gatorama is an alligator farm and visitor attraction in Palmdale, Florida, USA. Alligators and crocodiles are raised on the farm for meat and skins.

References

External links
Official website

Tourist attractions in Glades County, Florida
Zoos in Florida
Roadside attractions in Florida
Articles needing infobox zoo